Gordana "Goga" Sekulić (born 27 February 1977) is a Montenegrin-born Serbian singer. Born in Pljevlja, she saw her breakthrough with the debut album Ljubavnica in 2000. Sekulić has released eight studio albums to date and is recognized for hit songs like "Gaćice", "Tvoje oči", Sexy biznismen" (2006), "Muška lutka" (2011) and "Rekord sam oborila" (2014).

In addition to her music career, she appeared on the reality TV shows Veliki brat VIP 1 (2007) and Farma 6 (2015). Sekulić also participated in the series Guide to the Balkans (2012) by Vice as a representative of Serbian turbo-folk scene. In September 2022, American artist Ashnikko cited Sekulić as an inspiration for her music.

Sekulić married businessman Igor Ramović in May 2013, who two months later died from pancreatic cancer. Then, between 2016 and 2022, Sekulić was married to Serbian competitor of Brazilian jiu-jitsu Uroš Domanović. She gave birth to son Vasilij Andrej in late 2018. According to an Instagram post made during the 2022 FIFA World Cup, Sekulić has dual citizenship in Serbia and Switzerland.

Discography
Studio albums
Ljubavnica (2000)
I lepša i bolja (2001)
Opasno po zivot (2002)
Po zakonu (2003)
Gaćice (2006)
Zlatna koka (2008)
Ja sam probala sve (2011)
Ponovo rođena (2014)

Filmography

See also
Music of Serbia
Turbo-folk

References

External links
 

1977 births
Living people
Serbian turbo-folk singers
Serbian folk-pop singers
21st-century Serbian women singers
People from Pljevlja
Serbs of Montenegro
Montenegrin people of Serbian descent
Serbian people of Montenegrin descent
Grand Production artists
Big Brother (Serbian TV series)